Yacouba Coulibaly (born 2 October 1994) is a Burkinabé professional footballer who plays as a left back for the Burkina Faso national team.

Career
Born in Bobo-Dioulasso, Coulibaly has played for RC Bobo Dioulasso, Le Havre and Paris FC. He left Le Havre in January 2021, signing for Spanish club FC Cartagena on 8 March 2021.

He made his international debut in 2015, and was named in their squad for the 2017 Africa Cup of Nations.

References

External links

1994 births
Living people
Burkinabé footballers
Burkina Faso international footballers
RC Bobo Dioulasso players
Le Havre AC players
Paris FC players
FC Cartagena footballers
Ligue 2 players
Championnat National 2 players
Championnat National 3 players
Association football fullbacks
2017 Africa Cup of Nations players
Burkinabé expatriate footballers
Burkinabé expatriate sportspeople in France
Expatriate footballers in France
Burkinabé expatriate sportspeople in Spain
Expatriate footballers in Spain
Segunda División players
21st-century Burkinabé people